Main Street is a barbershop quartet that started singing as a group on March 20, 2011.

The quartet has won several awards, culminating in their 2017 win of the Barbershop Harmony Society's International Quartet Championship in Las Vegas, Nevada. Main Street participates in shows all over the United States, and all four members have been or are currently performing at Walt Disney World with the Dapper Dans and/or the Voices of Liberty.

Members

The members of Main Street combined have over 100 years of barbershop experience which includes thirteen International competition medals (4 gold, 6 silver, 3 bronze), two International collegiate medals, and eleven District quartet championships.

Tony DeRosa and Mike McGee have directed several choruses to District championships and competed as representatives at the International chorus competitions. Roger Ross has volunteered for several years as a Presentation judge for barbershop competitions and served in administrative positions, most notably as President of the Association of International Champions.

Ross and DeRosa have been inducted into the BHS Sunshine District Hall of Fame for their work in helping promote barbershop and the district in the state of Florida. Ross has also been named Barbershopper of the Year.

Awards

Discography 

 Smile (2018)

References

External links
 Official website
 AIC entry

Professional a cappella groups
Barbershop Harmony Society
Barbershop quartets
Musical groups established in 2011
2011 establishments in the United States